Myroconger gracilis is an eel in the family Myrocongridae (thin eels). It was described by Peter Henry John Castle in 1991. It is a marine, deep-water dwelling eel which is known from the Kyushu–Palau Ridge in the northwestern Pacific Ocean. It dwells at a depth range of 320–640 m. Females are known to reach a maximum standard length of 47.7 cm.

The species epithet gracilis refers to the slender body of the eel in comparison to Myroconger compressus (red eel).

References

Eels
Fish described in 1991